"I Can't Turn You Loose" is a song written and first recorded by American soul singer Otis Redding. It was released as the B-side to his 1965 single "Just One More Day". The up-tempo song became a bigger hit on the US R&B chart than its A-side and was one of Redding's signature songs and often appeared in his live performances.

Chart history

Cover versions
In 1968, the Chambers Brothers' version of this song reached number 37 on the Billboard Hot 100 singles chart.

References

Otis Redding songs
The Chambers Brothers songs
Songs written by Otis Redding
1965 songs
1965 singles
1968 singles
Atco Records singles
The Blues Brothers songs